Königsworther Platz is a Hanover Stadtbahn station served by lines 4 and 5. Fairground line 16 also terminates here. This station consists of a mezzanine level and two side platforms.

This station resembles a typical Berlin U-Bahn station: in fact there are lighting lanterns with hot light bulbs.

References

Hanover Stadtbahn stations